Jon Plumer (born March 1, 1955) is an American Republican politician and retired salesman.  He is a member of the Wisconsin State Assembly, representing the 42nd Assembly district since winning a June 2018 special election.

Biography
. Plumer won a special election, held on June 12, 2018, against Democrat Ann Groves Lloyd. He subsequently won a rematch with Groves Lloyd in the 2018 general election.

References

External links
 
 
 Representative Jon Plumer at Wisconsin Legislature

Living people
People from Lodi, Wisconsin
21st-century American politicians
1955 births
Republican Party members of the Wisconsin State Assembly